Lund is a municipality in Rogaland county, Norway. It is located in the traditional district of Dalane. The administrative centre of the municipality is the village of Moi. Other villages in Lund include Eik and, Heskestad. European route E39 and the Sørlandet Line both pass through Lund. Moi Station is a railway station in Lund.

The  municipality is the 237th largest by area out of the 356 municipalities in Norway. Lund is the 222nd most populous municipality in Norway with a population of 3,178.

General information

The parish of Lunde (later spelled Lund) was established as a municipality on 1 January 1838 (see formannskapsdistrikt law). During the 1960s, there were many municipal mergers across Norway due to the work of the Schei Committee. On 1 January 1965, most of the municipality of Heskestad (population: 547) was merged with Lund to form a much larger municipality of Lund.

Name
The municipality (originally the parish) is named after the old Lund farm, since the first Lund Church was built there. The name is identical with the word lundr which means "grove" (but here maybe 'sacred grove'). Before 1889, the name was written "Lunde".

Coat of arms
The coat of arms was granted on 14 December 1984. The arms show three joined acorns in gold on a green background. The acorns symbolize the many oak trees in the municipality, as well as many toponyms and names of farms, which start with Eik (oak), such as Eik, Eike, and Eikeland.

Churches
The Church of Norway has two parishes within the municipality of Lund. It is part of the Dalane prosti (deanery) in the Diocese of Stavanger.

Government
All municipalities in Norway, including Lund, are responsible for primary education (through 10th grade), outpatient health services, senior citizen services, unemployment and other social services, zoning, economic development, and municipal roads. The municipality is governed by a municipal council of elected representatives, which in turn elect a mayor.  The municipality falls under the Sør-Rogaland District Court and the Gulating Court of Appeal.

Municipal council
The municipal council of Lund is made up of 21 representatives that are elected to four year terms. Currently, the party breakdown is as follows:

Geography
The municipality of Lund lies in southeastern Rogaland county, along the border with Agder county. The municipality of Sokndal lies to the south, Eigersund lies to the west, Sirdal (in Agder) to the north/northeast, and Flekkefjord (also in Agder) to the east. The lake Lundevatnet lies on the southeastern border of Lund. The lake Hovsvatnet lies in the central part of Lund, north of Moi. The lakes Grøsfjellvatnet and Teksevatnet lie on the western borders of Lund.

Gallery

Climate

Notable residents

 Erik Vullum (1850 in Lund – 1916) a Norwegian journalist, writer and politician
 Pete Sanstol (1905 in Moi – 1982) a Norwegian professional boxer from Canada 
 Magnhild Eia (born 1960) a Norwegian politician, former deputy mayor of Lund
 Boye Brogeland (born 1973 in Moi) a Norwegian professional bridge player
 Børge André Rannestad (born 1973 in Moi) a retired Norwegian football midfielder
 Emil Nikolaisen (born 1977 in Moi) a musician, bandleader, & singer of Serena-Maneesh
 Hilma Nikolaisen (born 1982 in Moi) a Norwegian musician, singer and bass guitar player

References

External links

Municipal fact sheet from Statistics Norway 

 
Municipalities of Rogaland
1838 establishments in Norway